Annette Coe (born 4 March 1954) is a British former professional tennis player.

A left-handed player from Plymouth, Coe was active on tour in the 1970s. In her two singles second round appearance at Wimbledon, she had a narrow loss to Janet Young in 1974 but was double bageled by the top seeded Chris Evert in 1976. She made round of 16 in mixed doubles at the 1977 Wimbledon Championships (with Mark Edmondson).

References

External links
 
 

1954 births
Living people
British female tennis players
English female tennis players
Tennis people from Devon
Sportspeople from Plymouth, Devon